Richard Parks (born 1977) is a Welsh rugby union player turned extreme endurance athlete and television presenter.

Richard Parks may also refer to:
Rich Parks (1943–1978), American basketball player
Richard Parks (author) (born 1955), American writer

See also
Richard Parkes (disambiguation)
Richard Park (disambiguation)